Sir Herman David Weber FRCP (30 December 1823 – 11 November 1918) was a German physician who practiced medicine in England.

Biography

Weber attended Gymnasium in Fulda in 1838, but started his medical studies at Marburg University in 1844, graduating from Bonn in 1848. About 1854, he attended Guy's Hospital in London and became a member of the College of Physicians in England in 1855; he was elected a fellow in 1859. For many years, he served as the house physician (aka resident medical officer) at London's German Hospital. Based on his pioneering work on open-air treatment of consumption, he was knighted by Queen Victoria in 1899. Weber's syndrome is named after him.
Weber was an avid coin collector, and assembled a significant collection of Greek coins. He was awarded the medal of the Royal Numismatic Society in 1905.

Weber married and had children. His son, Frederick Parkes Weber, was also a physician and coin collector. Another son, Frank Weber, was an officer in the Royal Artillery.

Selected publications

The Spas and Mineral Waters of Europe (with Frederick Parkes Weber, 1896)
On Means for the Prolongation of Life (1906)

References

External links
 
 Biography
 The Weber Collection
 Obituary

1823 births
1918 deaths
Fellows of the Royal College of Physicians
19th-century German physicians
19th-century English medical doctors